RMS Carinthia was an ocean liner built in 1956 as one of the four Saxonia class ships. She sailed for Cunard Line from her completion until 1968 when she was sold to Sitmar Line, rebuilt into a full-time cruise ship and renamed SS Fairsea. She sailed with Sitmar until 1988, when Sitmar was sold to P&O. She was renamed SS Fair Princess and sailed for Princess Cruises and P&O Cruises until 2000. She was then sold to China Sea Cruises and renamed SS China Sea Discovery. In 2005 or 2006 she was scrapped in Alang, India.

Concept and construction
Near the end of 1951 Cunard Line designed new ships for Canadian service on the Liverpool-Montreal-Halifax route. Cunard originally decided to build just two ships but later on two more were ordered. These ships were the largest ships to be operated to Canada at the time. The ships were built in Clydebank and they were designed for luxury and speed including carrying passengers and cargo up the St Lawrence River in summer and to Pier 21 in Halifax in winter when the St. Lawrence froze.

Service history

Cunard Line 
RMS Carinthia started on her maiden voyage to Montreal on 27 June 1956 with 890 passengers and crew on board. After four more voyages, she proved with her running mate  that the new Canadian Cunarders were so successful that other ships operating on the route were all scrapped leaving the four ships on the Montreal route. During 1960, the Carinthia suffered a fire in one of her cabins. In June of that year, some deck hands  set up a skiffle group on a public deck; some passengers complained of the noise and the deck hands were fined a day's pay causing the "skiffle strike". The ship's crew went on strike and others came out in support leaving many liners tied up in the Liverpool docks for several weeks. In 1962 her propellers failed during a voyage. During 1964, the crew went on strike again. Carinthia was still operated from Liverpool to Montreal until the end of 1966, and from Southampton to Montreal and New York until after March 1967

Cunard Line decided to start operating the Carinthia as a cruise ship during the winter months. She was used on 10 day cruises from New York City to Bermuda. During 1968, along with RMS Sylvania, she was sold to Sitmar Line, initially renamed Fairland and laid up at Southampton for two years.

Sitmar Cruises 
Following year-long major refurbishments of both vessels in Italy, Fairland became Fairsea and in 1972 commenced cruising from the United States West Coast, for the re-styled Sitmar Cruises. 
As the "Fairsea" appeared in the U.S. TV series The Partridge Family in the episode "The Last Howard ", season 4, episode 7, airing 11/2/1973. The family was performing while on a cruise. The episode centered on daughter Laurie and a ship board romance. 
Following the sale of Sitmar to P&O in 1988, the vessel was transferred to Princess Cruises and used for Pacific Ocean cruises as the Fair Princess.

Princess Cruises and P&O Holidays 

In 1995, Fair Princess was transferred to the fleet of P&O Holidays (now P&O Cruises Australia) but was immediately chartered to Regency Cruises where she was to sail as their Regent Isle. Regent Isle was advertised for Regency's 1996 season, but due to their September 1995 bankruptcy, she never made a voyage for them.
In 1997 the ship commenced voyages for P&O Holidays, replacing the recently retired TSS Fairstar. She remained with P&O Australia for the remainder of the decade.

China Sea Cruises 

In 2000, the ship was sold to China Sea Cruises and renamed China Sea Discovery. She operated as a casino cruise ship but was unsuccessful. During 2001 she operated in Taiwan. Finally after many unsuccessful voyages she was moved to Alang, India, to be scrapped. While under scrapping, a fire broke out in the engine room, killing five workers, and injuring another fifteen people. In the end, the ship was scrapped in either 2005 or 2006.

References

External links
Ship History
Design and Construction

1955 ships
Ships built on the River Clyde
Passenger ships of the United Kingdom
Ships of Princess Cruises
Ships of the Cunard Line